Stenella tristaniae is a species of anamorphic fungi.

Description
Belonging to the Stenella genus, this species is a Cercospora-like fungus with a superficial secondary mycelium, solitary conidiophores, conidiogenous cells with thickened and darkened conidiogenous loci and catenate or single conidia with dark, slightly thickened hila.

See also
Stenella stipae
Stenella subsanguinea
Stenella vangueriae

References

Further reading

External links

tristaniae
Fungi described in 1966